Shirley M. Collado is an American psychology professor and academic administrator. She was the 9th president of Ithaca College. Collado was the second woman to hold the post and the first person of color. She is the first Dominican American to be named president of a four-year college in the United States. Prior to joining Ithaca, Collado was assistant professor of psychology, dean of the college and vice-president for student affairs at Middlebury College, then vice president for institutional planning and community engagement at Lafayette College. After returning to Middlebury College to serve as dean of the college, she became executive vice chancellor and chief operating officer at Rutgers University-Newark. She earned her doctorate at Duke University in the Department of Psychology and Neuroscience.

Early life and education
Collado grew up in Brooklyn, the child of Dominican immigrants; her father drove a taxi and her mother worked in a factory. Collado became the first in her family to attend college when she enrolled at Vanderbilt University in 1989, participating in a program called the Posse Foundation, which assembles small groups of diverse students to provide a support system to one another when they enroll together at the same college. Collado was one of five students enrolling in Vanderbilt in the first Posse cohort, and graduated with a Bachelor of Science in 1994. She then went on to earn an M.A. and Ph.D. from the Department of Psychology and Neuroscience at Duke University in 1999; her dissertation was titled "The Perceived Racism Scale for Latina/os: a Multidimensional Assessment of the Experience of Racism among Latina/os."

Career
After completing her doctorate in clinical psychology, Collado worked in community mental health, then returned to the Posse Foundation where she spent six years as executive vice president. She was appointed as Dean of Institutional Diversity at Middlebury College in 2007. In 2008, she was named vice-president for institutional planning and community engagement at Lafayette College. In 2010 she returned to Vermont to become an associate professor of psychology, dean of the college and chief diversity officer at Middlebury College and then, beginning in January 2015, executive vice chancellor and chief operating officer at Rutgers University-Newark, where she led the development of the university's Honors Living-Learning Community. On July 1, 2017, Collado became president of Ithaca College, replacing outgoing Tom Rochon to become the ninth president in the college's then-125-year history and the first person of color to hold the role. She was also given a courtesy appointment in Ithaca College's Department of Psychology.

Collado also serves on Board of Trust at Vanderbilt University.

In July 2021, Collado announced that she would step down as president of Ithaca College to become president and CEO of College Track, a program supporting college completion.

Collado is a member of the boards of ACT, Kids First Chicago, and Excelencia in Education. She is a founding member of President's Alliance on Higher Education and Immigration. In October 2022, Collado was appointed to serve as a Senior Fellow at Carnegie Foundation for the Advancement of Teaching.

Personal life
Collado is married to poet A. Van Jordan.

In 2001, Collado pleaded no contest to one count of misdemeanor sexual abuse. Collado denied the charges, brought by a former patient, saying that she took a plea agreement because at the time (shortly after the suicide of her first husband), she lacked the resources to contest the charges in court.

References

External links
 About Shirley M. Collado  - Office of the President, Ithaca College

Living people
Vanderbilt University alumni
Duke University alumni
Middlebury College faculty
American women psychologists
21st-century American psychologists
Ithaca College faculty
Rutgers University faculty
Posse Foundation
People from Brooklyn
American people of Dominican Republic descent
Year of birth missing (living people)
Presidents of Ithaca College
Women heads of universities and colleges
American women academics